The 1935 Dayton Flyers football team was an American football team that represented the University of Dayton as a member of the Buckeye Athletic Association during the 1935 college football season. In its 13th season under head coach Harry Baujan, the team compiled a 4–4–1 record.

Schedule

References

Dayton
Dayton Flyers football seasons
Dayton Flyers football